Neptuak Mountain was named by Samuel E.S. Allen in 1894. "Neptuak" is the Stoney Indian word for "nine" as Neptuak Mountain is peak #9 in the Valley of the Ten Peaks. It is located on the Continental Divide, which is also the British Columbia-Alberta border in this region, and is in the Bow Range of the Park Ranges of the Canadian Rockies. The summit is a tripoint for Banff National Park, Kootenay National Park, and Yoho National Park, where the three parks share a common border.

Geology
Like other mountains in Banff Park, Neptuak is composed of sedimentary rock laid down during the Precambrian to Jurassic periods. Formed in shallow seas, this sedimentary rock was pushed east and over the top of younger rock during the Laramide orogeny.

Climate
Based on the Köppen climate classification, Neptuak is located in a subarctic climate with cold, snowy winters, and mild summers.

See also
 List of peaks on the British Columbia–Alberta border

Further reading

References

External links
 National Park Service web site: Banff National Park
 National Park Service web site: Kootenay National Park
 National Park Service web site: Yoho National Park
 Neptuak weather: Mountain Forecast

Three-thousanders of Alberta
Three-thousanders of British Columbia
Canadian Rockies
Mountains of Banff National Park
Kootenay National Park
Mountains of Yoho National Park
Great Divide of North America